Serpent Mage is a fantasy novel by American writers Margaret Weis and Tracy Hickman, the fourth book in The Death Gate Cycle series. It was released in 1992.

Plot summary

After the four worlds Alfred has at last found  his people on Chelstra, the realm of sea. But his  travels have taught him to be cautious... and  Alfred soon realizes his caution is justified, even  among his own kind. The one person Alfred can trust  is, strangely, Haplo the Patryn. But Haplo's lord  has decreed all Sartan to be the enemy, and Haplo  dares not go against his lord. Now the companions  have arrived in a land where humans, elves, and  dwarves have learned to live in peace. Unaware of an  even greater threat to all the realms, it is  Sartan and Patryn who will disrupt this alliance of the  lesser races in their struggle to gain control of  all four worlds. Only Alfred and Haplo realize  that they have a much older—and more powerful—enemy than each other, Samah, the nominal leader of all Sartan. Samah defeats them, and Alfred goes into exile, with Haplo imprisoned.

Criticism and praise

The book hit the bestseller lists for Locus, Waldenbooks, and B. Dalton.

References

1992 American novels
Novels by Margaret Weis
Novels by Tracy Hickman
The Death Gate Cycle novels